Jaipur–Hyderabad Express is an Express train of the Indian Railways connecting  in Rajasthan and   in Telangana. It is currently being operated with 53229/53230 train numbers on twice a week basis.

Service

It averages 53 km/hr as 17019 Ajmer–Hyderabad Weekly Express and covers 1866.8 km in 38 hrs 30 mins & 52 km/hr as 17020 Hyderabad–Ajmer Weekly Express and covers 1866.8 km in 35 hrs 50 mins.

Route and halts 

The important halts of the train are :

Traction

Both trains are hauled by a twin Diesel Loco Shed, Moula Ali -based WDM-3A diesel locomotive.

Direction reversal

The train reverses its direction one times:

Another train with similar name

Ajmer–Hyderabad Meenakshi Express (train numbers 12719/12720) is another train that runs between Hyderabad and Ajmer twice a week. From Purna it goes to Akola and then Itarsi. Therefore, the distance is shoter at 1624 km and the time taken is 31 hours.

See also 
 Ajmer Junction railway station
 Ajmer–Hyderabad Meenakshi Express
 Hyderabad Deccan railway station

References

References 
17019/Ajmer - Hyderabad Weekly Express
17020/Hyderabad - Ajmer Weekly Express

Rail transport in Telangana
Rail transport in Madhya Pradesh
Rail transport in Rajasthan
Express trains in India
Transport in Ajmer
Transport in Hyderabad, India
Rail transport in Maharashtra